RAI's production center in Naples is one of four regional television and radio production centers belonging to the Italian public broadcaster RAI. The center is located in Naples in southern Italy, while the other three production centers are located in Rome, Milan and Turin. Construction began in the late 1950s, and the center was opened on 7 March 1963 by Prime Minister Amintore Fanfani.

Venue and facilities

The center is located on Via Guglielmo Marconi near to San Paolo Stadium, in the Fuorigrotta district of Naples. The center has six TV studios with a total space of 1,227 square meters and room for 370 spectators. The studios are used to produce television programs, debates, drama series and soap operas which are then broadcast on the broadcaster Rai's channels.

The center's largest facility is the Auditorium Rai di Napoli, a concert hall with around 1,000 seats designed by artcitects	Renato Avolio De Martino,  and Raffaele Contigiani. The hall has a floor area of 800 square meters, and on the stage there is a large pipe organ. Rai has produced and recorded a number of radio and television concerts in the hall, including the 1965 Eurovision Song Contest. After a renovation of the auditorium in the 2000s by  the Neapolitan studio Gnosis Architettura, the number of seats was reduced to 600 and the organ was renovated.

The center also houses the historical archives of the Canzone Napoletana, the traditional form of music performed in the local Neapolitan language. The archive contains over 50,000 classical Neapolitan songs.

References

Bibliography

External links

Television studios
Buildings and structures in Naples
Rai (broadcaster)
Office buildings completed in 1963
1963 establishments in Italy
Mass media in Naples